Return of Hanuman is a 2007 Indian Hindi-language animated action-adventure comedy film directed by Anurag Kashyap. A sequel to Hanuman, it was produced by Shailendra Singh at Percept Picture Company and Toonz Animation, and the music was composed by Tapas Relia. It is a children's film and has been rated as an Educational Film by the CBFC because it deals with the issue of global warming. It was released in India on 28 December 2007.

Plot
Devas are ’busy’ in their Swarglok (heaven). Technology has crossed the boundaries of earth and even non-mortal devas have become techno-geeks. They converse in Hinglish. Meanwhile, a terrific war is being fought between the Devas and the Asuras. In this war, Lord Vishnu slices the demon Rahuketu into two parts through his stomach. His collapse invokes the Guru of Asuras, Guru Shukracharya and he comes forward to battle with Lord Vishnu. He also slices a large snake named Kaladansh into two parts. Lord Vishnu gains an upper hand in the war and throws Shukracharya into space. Shukracharya announces a prophecy throughout the Universe warning Lord Vishnu that the same humans whom he is protecting, in Kali Yuga they will themselves become very cruel than even demons and a day will come when their cruelty will give rise to the greatest demon of the Universe which will engulf the whole humankind. Shukracharya then transforms himself into Planet Shukra or Venus and it becomes the home of demons. Later he joins Rahuketu's sliced body with that of Kaladansh's tail and vice versa. This gives rise to two demons Rahu and Ketu. Shukracharya declares that as long as his Sarpdand i.e. Snake Wand lives, the demons will remain powerful.

Hanuman, who has just returned to heaven after completing his task on earth, is bored. He sees a village boy who is bullied by his classmates. He decides to help him, not as a God or an invisible force but as a human. He then asks Lord Brahma to allow him to take birth as a human being. Brahma allows but keeps some conditions which Hanuman agrees to accept. He appears on earth in a village named Bajrangpur from a priest and his wife as a human baby. What makes the reincarnated Hanuman different from other humans is that he has a tail and a huge appetite. The baby is named "Maruti" by his mother. After Maruti is three months old, he takes admission in the same school where the boy he wanted to help studies and befriends with him. Thereafter, he teaches a lesson to his bully classmates, Gabbar Singh and his gang.

Meanwhile, on planet Shukra, there is a fight between Rahu and Ketu and accidentally the Sarpdand comes to Earth. Danavs come to Earth to search for it but they have to face Maruti. Maruti easily defeats Rahu and Ketu with the help of his army of monkeys that came to help him to get free from the hands of culprits (who caught him because he stole the mangoes from his garden). In order to defeat Rahu and Ketu, Narada must remind Maruti that he is actually Hanuman. After Narada and Maruti meet, Maruti is reminded that he can turn to Hanuman as per his will. Maruti then turns to the more powerful Hanuman, with his godly powers. He still has the appearance of a child but looks like child Hanuman, the appearance from the film's predecessor. Then a monster made of polythene and other non-biodegradable waste appears from a volcano that was said to form when Sarpdand merged with the Kamandal thrown by Shukracharya which coincidentally fell into the volcano in Bajrangpur. The monsters keep on swallowing the villagers of Bajrangpur. After struggling to stop the monster, Hanuman asked for help from God Ram. God Ram then said that when a blockage, which is seen in the end, is cleared then the monster (mainly made of plastic and other waste thrown by humans) will finish up. Hanuman did what Ram said, and the monster was defeated. Finally, Hanuman said his farewells to his family and friends and leaves Bajrangpur.

Voice Cast
Malak Shah as Maruti
Suraj as Minkoo
Uday Sabnis as Brahma
Dhananjai Shrestha as Indra
Ayesha Raza as Maruti's mother
Chetanya Adib as Hanuman
Rajeev Raj as Narad
Sudesh Bhosale as Owner
Rajendra Gupta as Guru Shukracharya
Pratibha Sharma as Minkoo's mother
Girish Sahdev as Professor Antariksh
Kenny Desai as Professor Jwalamukhi
Gurpal Singh as Principal Bhullar
Archie Maitra as Tunnu
Aditya Rao as Dadoo
Akshata as Munni
Narendra Jha as Rahu and Ketu
Parminder Ghumman as one-eyed man
Trilok Patel as Vishnu
Ajay Singhal as Maruti's father

Soundtrack

The film has seven songs, including two instrumental tracks, composed by Tapas Relia and with lyrics penned by Satish Mutatkar.

Spin-offs
A spin-off series named The New Adventures of Hanuman was produced and aired on Pogo TV and Cartoon Network India. The series have some differences compared to the movie, such as Maruti staying in Bajrangpur instead of leaving it and a number of new characters. Maruti is also required to use a mace locket to turn into Hanuman.

In the mobile game space, Jump Games announced a two-year deal with Percept Pictures for the creation and distribution of Hanuman Returns mobile games, at a launch event in Mumbai that featured film Director, David Dhawan.

On the film's 12 year anniversary, Director Anurag Kashyap, said that Return of Hanuman was a 'terrible film' and that he was 'incapable of doing animation'. It is the only animation film he has ever made.

See also
List of indian animated feature films
Anurag Kashyap filmography
List of Hindi films of 2007

References

External links
"Hanuman gets Educational Certificate from Censor"

Return of Hanuman at Percept Picture Company's website.

Indian animated films
Films about Hinduism
2000s Hindi-language films
2007 films
Films directed by Anurag Kashyap
Indian children's films
Indian action films
Hanuman in popular culture
Films with screenplays by Anurag Kashyap
2007 action films
2000s children's films
Hindi-language action films
Films scored by Tapas Relia